Jean Daetwyler (24 January 1907, Basel – 4 June 1994, Sierre) was a Swiss composer and musician. He is barely remembered, mostly for his largely forgotten works for alphorn inspired by Jozsef Molnar beginning in 1970. Also inspired by trombonist  and other aspects of Swiss culture.

Daetwyler was a pupil of Vincent d'Indy at the Paris Conservatoire.  He returned to Switzerland in 1933 to teach for over four decades. His work was also part of the music event in the art competition at the 1948 Summer Olympics.

References

External links
 Video: Jean Daetwyler en 1967, il dirige un chœur pour le Vendredi-Saint, une archive de la Télévision suisse romande.
 Official website of the Jean Daetwyler Foundation You can find  a lot of information about the musician and about the Foundation.

1907 births
1994 deaths
Swiss classical composers
Musicians from Basel-Stadt
Conservatoire de Paris alumni
Pupils of Vincent d'Indy
20th-century classical composers
Swiss male classical composers
20th-century male musicians
Olympic competitors in art competitions
20th-century Swiss composers